KASY-TV (channel 50) is a television station in Albuquerque, New Mexico, United States, affiliated with MyNetworkTV. It is owned by Mission Broadcasting alongside Santa Fe–licensed de facto CW owned-and-operated station KWBQ, channel 19 (and its Roswell-based satellite, KRWB-TV, channel 21). The two stations share studios with dual CBS/Fox affiliate KRQE (channel 13) on Broadcast Plaza in Albuquerque; KASY-TV's transmitter is located atop Sandia Crest.

Nexstar Media Group, which owns KRQE and holds a majority stake in The CW, provides master control, technical, engineering and accounting services for KASY-TV and KWBQ through a shared services agreement (SSA), though the two stations are otherwise operated separately from KRQE as Mission handles programming, advertising sales and retransmission consent negotiations.

History
KASY-TV first signed on the air on October 6, 1995, owned by Ramar Communications and managed by Lee Enterprises (then-owners of CBS affiliate KRQE) under a local marketing agreement (LMA). The station was primarily a UPN affiliate, but had a secondary affiliation with The WB; this was easy to do as neither network had more than a couple nights a week of programming at that time. Initially, KASY ran cartoons (such as Highlander: The Animated Series, The Flintstones, Mutant League and Mighty Max), old movies, talk shows, classic sitcoms (such as Gilligan's Island, I Love Lucy and The Andy Griffith Show), recent off-network sitcoms (such as Harry and the Hendersons). In fall 1997, KASY dropped WB programming and became an exclusive UPN affiliate; The WB would return to the market when upstart KWBQ signed on in March 1999 with a similar general entertainment format. In the interim, WB programming was brought in out-of-market from KTLA in Los Angeles or Chicago-based superstation WGN on Albuquerque area cable providers.

In June 1999, ACME Communications, KWBQ's owner, bought KASY from Ramar and terminated the local marketing agreement with Lee Enterprises, resulting in the creation of the first major television duopoly in the Albuquerque market. Most of the programming inventory airing on KASY was also acquired by ACME, while some of the shows that aired on KASY under the LMA remained with Lee to be broadcast on KRQE. After the sale to ACME was completed, KASY stopped rebroadcasting certain local newscasts from KRQE.

That fall, KASY dropped its UPN affiliation due to contract disputes between the network and ACME Communications (which was closely associated with UPN's rival The WB) and became an independent station. In the interim, UPN programming was brought in out-of-market from KCOP in Los Angeles on Albuquerque area cable providers, while over-the-air viewers were unable to view UPN programming. While the station was an independent (during which it was branded as "Superstation 50"), KASY broadcast movies and syndicated programming during primetime hours to replace UPN programs. By February 2000, the UPN affiliation was returned to KASY, rebranding as "UPN 50;" KCOP was then pulled from area cable systems at KASY's request.

On January 24, 2006, Time Warner and CBS Corporation announced that The WB and UPN would merge to create The CW Television Network. One month later on February 22, 2006, News Corporation announced the creation of MyNetworkTV. KASY affiliated with MyNetworkTV on September 5, 2006, with KWBQ joining The CW two weeks later on September 18; the station was also rebranded as "My50TV" (KASY was the only ACME-owned station that was not affiliated with The CW; ACME was the third company, after Capitol Broadcasting Company and Weigel Broadcasting, to own both CW and MyNetworkTV affiliates in the same market).

KASY-TV broadcast games from the Colorado Rockies during the 2008 Major League Baseball season. Starting in the Fall of 2008, KASY-TV began broadcasting several University of New Mexico Lobos college basketball games, the contract was renewed for the 2009 and 2010 basketball season. On April 30, 2008, KASY-TV broadcast their first program in true high definition, the MyNetworkTV sitcom Under One Roof. On June 4, 2010, ACME Communications announced that it would enter into a shared services agreement with LIN Media; as a result, LIN's own duopoly of KASA-TV and KRQE would provide technical, engineering and accounting services for KWBQ and KASY, with the mutual operating costs shared in order to help reduce overall costs for ACME.

On September 10, 2012, ACME announced a proposed sale of KASY-TV as well as KWBQ (and its Roswell repeater, KRWB-TV) to Tamer Media, a company founded by broadcast industry veteran John S. Viall, Jr. The $17.3 million sale, which the FCC approved on November 21, and was completed on December 11, gives Tamer Media its first TV properties, while ACME makes its exit from the station ownership business (the three stations were the last portions of ACME's TV station portfolio). The stations' shared services agreement with LIN Media continued with new ownership. On March 21, 2014, Media General announced that it would purchase LIN Media and its stations, including KRQE, KASA-TV, and the SSA with KASY-TV and KWBQ/KRWB-TV, in a $1.6 billion merger. The merger was completed on December 19. Just over a year later, on January 27, 2016, it was announced that the Nexstar Broadcasting Group would buy Media General for $4.6 billion. The sale was completed on January 17, 2017.

On August 7, 2020, it was announced that Mission Broadcasting would acquire KASY and KWBQ (and its satellites) from Tamer Media. The sale was completed on November 16.

"My50TV VJ"
Starting in March 2008, KASY-TV incorporated the VJ element to the station, having a host for the station's evening MyNetworkTV and syndicated programming from 7–11 p.m. weeknights. The "My50TV VJ" appears on-air approximately twice each hour to introduce shows, tease promotional events and conduct prize giveaways. The reigning Miss New Mexico at the time, Jenny Marlowe, was the station's first VJ; she was succeeded by Casey Messer in April 2009. Ashley Reid and Adam Otero took over in December, followed by Britaña Campos in March 2010 and then by Leah Black, former radio DJ for KKOB-FM and defunct alternative rock station KTZO in March 2011. Amber Pohl was the station's VJ until March 2013 followed by Shannon McVey. Throughout 2014, the VJ was ReShea Kelly who was also the "CW Star" for sister station KWBQ. The final regular VJ was Rachel Jordan.

Technical information

Subchannels
The station's ATSC 1.0 channels are carried on the multiplexed digital signals of other Albuquerque–Santa Fe television stations:

KASY has not carried any subchannels in past years but on January 11, 2016, the station added the suspense channel Escape from Katz Broadcasting. KASY further added on GetTV to 50.3 on January 14, 2017, and added Cozi TV to 50.4 on January 18, 2017, all as a result of the January 2017 sale of KASA-TV to Ramar Communications, as well as the switch in Fox affiliation over to KRQE. In mid-December 2021, Cozi TV was replaced by Court TV on channel 50.4 after Cozi TV returned to KASA following the purchase by parent company NBCU. Court TV is also aired locally on KLUZ 14.4.

Analog-to-digital conversion
KASY-TV shut down its analog signal, over UHF channel 50, on June 12, 2009, the official date in which full-power television stations in the United States transitioned from analog to digital broadcasts under federal mandate. The station's digital signal remained on its pre-transition UHF channel 45. Through the use of PSIP, digital television receivers display the station's virtual channel as its former UHF analog channel 50.

As part of the SAFER Act, KASY-TV kept its analog signal on the air until June 26 to inform viewers of the digital television transition through the loop of public service announcements from the National Association of Broadcasters.

ATSC 3.0
KASY switched to ATSC 3.0 broadcasts on December 13, 2022, hosting KRQE, KWBQ and KOAT in addition to KASY.

References

External links

MyNetworkTV affiliates
Ion Mystery affiliates
GetTV affiliates
Court TV affiliates
Television channels and stations established in 1995
ASY-TV
Mass media in Albuquerque, New Mexico
1995 establishments in New Mexico
Nexstar Media Group
ATSC 3.0 television stations